The following lists events that happened during 2012 in Bhutan.

Incumbents
 Monarch: Jigme Khesar Namgyel Wangchuck 
 Prime Minister: Jigme Thinley

Events

June
 June 26 – Bhutan's four-century-old Wangdue Phodrang Dzong, a ridge-top monastery, catches fire and is destroyed; however no relics were destroyed since the monastery was undergoing a renovation.

References

 
2010s in Bhutan
Years of the 21st century in Bhutan
Bhutan
Bhutan